WCSJ may refer to:

 WCSJ-FM, a radio station (103.1 FM) licensed to Morris, Illinois, United States
 WAUR (AM), a radio station (1550 AM) licensed to Somonauk, Illinois, which held the call sign WCSJ from 1963 to 2022